Şevket Sabancı (1936 – 22 July 2021) was a Turkish billionaire businessman and philanthropist, and a second-generation member of the Sabancı family.

Biography
He was born 1936 in Kayseri, Turkey, as the fourth son of Hacı Ömer Sabancı, a self-made wealthy trader, and Sadıka. Şevket was educated in textile engineering at the University of Manchester Institute of Science and Technology (UMIST) in England. Returned home, he worked at managerial positions in a number of textile companies owned by his family. After 1980, he went abroad to represent Sabancı Holding. Şevket Sabancı was the chairman of Esas Holding, the investment vehicle of his family, which owns the largest low-cost carrier in Turkey Pegasus Airlines.

Şevket Sabancı was also a founding member of the Sabancı Foundation VakSA.

He was married to Hayırlı Zerrin, with whom he has two daughters Emine Kamışlı, Sadıka Sabancı, and a son Ali Sabancı.

He died at the age of 85 on 22 July 2021.

Esas Holding

Esas Holding, the family office of the Turkish billionaire and philanthropist Sevket Sabanci, was founded in 2000, and is led by his daughter Emine Sabancı Kamışlı and son Ali Sabanci. As of 2017, total assets under management is estimated to be anywhere between $4 billion to $7 billion, making it the biggest single family office in Turkey.

Esas Holding is based in Istanbul, Turkey with an additional office in London. Direct investments and real estate development are key operating areas of the family office. Most of its direct investments are in Turkey and is made with a private equity strategy; the firm seeks to hold majority and minority stake with controlling rights, and seeks to invest for a period of between four years and six years. Some major investments of this division include Turkey's biggest low-cost carrier Pegasus Airlines, Turkey's biggest Ro Ro company Un-Ro Ro, and Turkey's biggest sports club chain Mars Athletic. In 2016 Esas sold Cinemaximum, Turkey's biggest cinema chain, to the Korean cinema operator CGV for $800 million, and its snack business Peyman to London-based PE Fund Bridgepoint Capital for $100 million.

Esas Properties, the real estate division of Esas Holding, builds and operates shopping malls across Turkey. Property arm of Esas is also the most international division of the group, Esas Properties owns several office buildings and shopping malls in cities such as London, New York, Frankfurt, and Aberdeen.

References

External links
 Biography at Sabancı Holding website

1936 births
2021 deaths
People from Kayseri
Sevket Sabanci
Turkish businesspeople
Turkish philanthropists
Turkish billionaires
Tarsus American College alumni
Alumni of the University of Manchester Institute of Science and Technology